The Kawasaki Kinen (Kawasaki Memorial) (川崎記念) is a Japanese thoroughbred horse race  on dirt track for horses aged four years or older. It was graded as a domestic grade 1 race in 1998. It is held in January, so it is the first (domestic) grade 1 race in Japanese horseracing season. Its name "Kawasaki" comes from that of Kawasaki city in Kanagawa prefecture.

This race is regarded as preparation for the Dubai World Cup, along with the February Stakes, although some past winners (such as Smart Falcon and Vermilion) ran the Dubai World Cup after winning this race.

Records
Most successful horses (3 wins):
 Countess Up – 1985, 1986, 1987
 Hokko Tarumae – 2014, 2015, 2016

Other repeat winners (2 wins):
 Ichi Kanto – 1958, 1959
 Gold Spencer – 1980, 1981
 Daring Grass – 1982, 1984
 Hokuto Vega – 1996, 1997
 Abukuma Poro – 1998, 1999
 Vermilion – 2007, 2010
 Chuwa Wizard – 2020, 2022

Winners since 2000 

Open middle distance horse races
Dirt races in Japan